Deh Abbas (also Romanized as Deh ‘Abbās and Deh-e ‘Abbās; also known as Den ‘Abbās) is a village in Deh Abbas Rural District, in the Central District of Eslamshahr County, Tehran Province, Iran. At the 2006 census, its population was 917, in 238 families.

References 

Populated places in Eslamshahr County